Álexander Leonardo Bolaños Reascos (born January 22, 1985) is an Ecuadorian who currently plays for CD La Unión as a footballer.

Career
Bolaños began his career at Guayaquil-based club Barcelona in 2005 during the Clausura championship. He continued to play for the club until they released him as a result of his criminal case. After serving time in prison, he was signed by LDU Quito in the later half of 2009 as an emergency signing. Despite not making any league appearances in 2009 due to ineligibility, he played one match for the club during the 2009 Copa Sudamericana. Liga would go on to win the competition and give Bolaños his first piece of silverware. Due to a lack of possible playing time, LDU Quito loaned Bolaños to crosstown-team Universidad Católica for the 2010 season. For the 2011 season, he was signed by Deportivo Quito.

In June 2019, he joined LDU Loja.

Family
Bolaños is the older brother of Miller Bolaños, a midfielder who plays for Grêmio.

Criminal case
Bolaños was involved in a fatal car crash in which his car struck the vehicle of Fabricio Gerardo Quezada, who was killed in the crash. Bolaños was sentenced to seven years in prison for drunk driving and manslaughter. He was released in September 2009 after a successful appeal of his sentence.

Honors
LDU Quito
Copa Sudamericana: 2009

References

External links

Bolaños' FEF player card 

1985 births
Living people
People from San Lorenzo, Ecuador
Ecuadorian footballers
Barcelona S.C. footballers
L.D.U. Quito footballers
C.D. Universidad Católica del Ecuador footballers
S.D. Quito footballers
Olimpo footballers
S.D. Aucas footballers
Santa Cruz Futebol Clube players
Delfín S.C. footballers
Fuerza Amarilla S.C. footballers
L.D.U. Loja footballers
Ecuadorian Serie A players
Campeonato Brasileiro Série A players
Argentine Primera División players
Ecuador international footballers
Ecuadorian expatriate footballers
Expatriate footballers in Argentina
Ecuadorian expatriate sportspeople in Argentina
Ecuadorian expatriate sportspeople in Brazil
Expatriate footballers in Brazil
Association football midfielders